The South African History Archive Trust, better known as SAHA, is an independent archive dedicated to documenting, supporting and promoting greater awareness of past and contemporary struggles for justice through archival practice, outreach, and the utilisation of the Promotion of Access to Information Act, 2000 (PAIA). SAHA was founded in the 1980s as increasing state censorship in South Africa threatened to obscure the struggle against human rights violations and the oppressive political regime of apartheid. Since 2012 SAHA has been based at the Women's Gaol Museum, Constitution Hill where it took over responsibility for archiving the Constitution Hill Trust records in addition to its original collection.

History

Origins 
SAHA was founded in 1988 by representatives of the Mass Democratic Movement (MDM). The MDM was composed of a variety of anti-apartheid activist organisations including the United Democratic Front (UDF) and the Congress of South African Trade Unions (Cosatu). Organisations joining the MDM were dealing with a growing number of restrictions or had been banned by the National Party government. In a climate of censorship SAHA was formed by the MDM to keep the records of anti-apartheid organisations safe ensuring the struggles for liberation would be documented. In 1987 the Popular History Trust (PHT) in Harare, Zimbabwe, began collecting material from South African political organisations. A large quantity of the current SAHA collection was under threat resulting in it being sent to PHT to prevent its destruction by the apartheid state. PHT provided a safe location outside of South Africa where the future archival material of SAHA could be protected while remaining accessible. In the 1990s the bans on many political parties and activists were lifted making it possible for the archive to return to its country of origin. PHT dissolved as an independent organisation in Harare. At the legal forming of SAHA in 1991 PHT resources and the collections were transferred to SAHA.

1990–2012 
During the 1990s and up until 2012, SAHA was based at the University of the Witwatersrand (Wits) in the William Cullen Library. While based at Wits, SAHA often worked  with Historical Papers, sharing resources and undertaking joint projects such as the 1981 Detainees Oral History project and the Exiles Oral History Project.

During the 1980s SAHA's collection had been organised according to the needs of its founders and contributors, namely the administrative arms of political parties. Much of this bureaucratic method of organisation required re-evaluation. During the 1990s SAHA was primarily concerned with making the archive responsive to the growing number of post-apartheid researchers and with collecting documents in danger of destruction.

In 1997 SAHA created a core programme, originally called the Gay and Lesbian Archives (GALA) to help provide better access to the LGBTI records within SAHA and to assist in the organisation thereof. GALA became an independent organisation in 2007 changing its name to Gay and Lesbian Memory in Action while retaining the acronym GALA.

In 2002 SAHA started an intensive program of digitisation and organisation of the archive.

In 2012 SAHA left Wits and moved to Constitution Hill where it is still situated today in the former Women's Jail.

Current 
SAHA functions as a Trust and a  nonprofit organization under the direction of a board of trustees.

SAHA mandate is to support struggles for justice by:
 Recording aspects of South African democracy in the making.
 Recovering lost and neglected histories.
 Bringing history out of the archives and into schools, universities and communities in new and innovative ways.
 Extending the boundaries of freedom of information in South Africa.
 Raising awareness, both nationally and internationally, of the role of archives and documentation play in promoting and defending human rights.

Core programmes 
SAHA organises its activities around two core programmes: the Struggle for Justice Programme (SFJP), and the Freedom of Information Programme (FOIP).

Struggle for Justice Programme (SFJP) 

SFJP represents the original intentions of the archive at its founding in 1988. It is dedicated to preserving, creating access to, and collecting records that document struggles against the injustices of apartheid as well as contemporary struggles for social justice. In addition to fulfilling an archival role, SFJP also seeks to activate the archive. Activating the archive is a process of continually seeking to make the archive relevant to current researchers and promote its accessibility to the general public. SFJP activates the archive through publications, educational guidebooks for schools and teacher workshops, as well as through physical, traveling and online exhibitions.

Freedom of Information Programme (FOIP) 

FOIP was established in 2001 following the enactment of the PAIA. PAIA has made it possible to access information held by the state or by private bodies, but in the latter case, only if needed to protect or exercise another right.

FOIP is dedicated to extending the boundaries of freedom of information in South Africa by creating awareness of the right of access to information and its power to assist in exercising and defending other human rights. FOIP provides advice and guidance to those wishing to make PAIA requests, runs workshops, and issues publications. As part of their programme, FOIP also empowers individuals and organisations to understand and utilise PAIA as a strategic advocacy tool. FOIP works to increase compliance with and the use of PAIA. Through the use of PAIA, FOIP has expanded the role of SAHA as an activist archive and helps to keep SAHA's collections relevant and responsive to researcher and community needs.

Notable projects

Right to Truth (RTT) 
SAHA's Right to Truth project (RTT) is focused on making the work and records of the South African Truth and Reconciliation Commission (TRC) and other records of apartheid-era human rights abuses more readily accessible. Over the course of 2014 to 2015 FOIP, through a PAIA request, gained access to the closed section 29 hearing transcripts of the TRC; making these records part of SAHA's collection. RTT is responsible for consolidating the TRC section 29 records with related TRC material held at SAHA.  RTT is working towards making the S29 TRC records accessible in an online searchable format. RTT also assists in making available the transcripts and testimonies of the TRC and jointly with the South African Broadcasting Corporation (SABC) makes available the documentary Special Report.

PAIA Request Tracker 
The PAIA Request Tracker is an online information management tool, developed by SAHA, to track requests made by SAHA and its civil society partners under PAIA. The tracker streamlines the request process, making it easier for civil society organisations to submit requests. It includes mechanisms to create, send and track the progress of PAIA requests and all related communication with the public and private bodies responsible for processing those requests.

In addition the Request Tracker functions as a tool for monitoring public and private bodies' compliance with the act. The Request Tracker is an information management tool that enables the public to compare compliance by various public and private bodies against prescribed timelines and other obligations in PAIA.

Sunday Times Heritage Project 
To mark its 100th year of publication in 2006, the Sunday Times embarked on a project to erect a trail of memorials across South Africa to commemorate some of the remarkable people and events that made history from 1906 to 2006. It set out to commemorate remarkable people and events selected from different arenas of South Africa's past; SAHA extended the project  and made accessible a range of media, such as radio, DVD, the web, as well as an oral history and heritage project for schools. Subjects include but are not limited to Happyboy Mgxaji,  Mohandas Gandhi, Duma Nokwe, Tsietsi Mashinini, Brenda Fassie, Bethuel Mokgosinyana and the Orlando Pirates, Lilian Ngoyi, John Vorster Square and death in detention, Isaac Wauchope and the sinking of the SS Mendi and the Purple March.

Collections 

SAHA currently has over 140 collections. These include significant collections relating to the anti-apartheid struggle, the United Democratic Front (UDF) and the South African Truth and Reconciliation Commission (TRC).  The collections consist of donated material from individuals and organisations, as well as materials created or collected in the course of SAHA's various oral history, education, heritage and outreach projects. FOIP is also contributing a fast growing body of information it has obtained by using PAIA. SAHA's collections consists of a variety of material including documents, posters, photographs, oral history recordings, music, and other ephemera.

Exhibitions

Exhibition kits 

In order to enable community-based and educational organisations to host low-cost exhibitions, in order to explore issues specific to their communities or to commemorate key moments in South African history, SAHA develops thematic exhibition kits for loan. These exhibition kits are suitable for use at short-term events (for example, conferences and civil society workshops), or for longer exhibitions at community halls and memorials sites. The kits currently relate to three themes: women, workers and youth.

Virtual exhibitions 
 The End Conscription Campaign (2009)
 Hear Our History – An Introduction to Teaching and Learning Oral History (2010)
 The United Democratic Front (UDF) 30 years on (2010)
 The Cornerstone of Democracy – South Africa's Bill of Rights (2010)
 Transitions Child – The Anti-Privatisation Forum (2012)
 Entering Tembisa – An Oral and Photographic Exploration of the Community (2012)
 Zimbabwe African People's Union (ZAPU) – Through the Lens of Zenzo Nkobi (2012)
 Women Hold Up Half The Sky (2012)
 Hlangnani Basebenzi – Commemorating South Africa's Labour Movement (2012)
 The Future is Ours – Commemorating the Youth in the Struggle (2012)
 Shifty Records (2014)
 Tracing the Unbreakable Thread – Non Racialism in South Africa (2016)
 Images of Defiance – South African Resistance Posters of the 1980's and Beyond (2017)
 Masibuyele Emasimini – Legacies of the 1913 Land Act (coming soon)

Publications 
A list of SAHA publications

SFJP publications 
 Women Hold Up Half the Sky (Exhibitions in the Classroom Booklet)
 Hlangnani Basebenzi – Commemorating South Africa's Labour Movement (Exhibitions in the Classroom Booklet)
 The Future Is Ours (Exhibitions in the Classroom Booklet)
 Between Life and Death: Stories from John Vorster Square
 The Battle Against Forgetting: Human Rights and the Unfinished Business of the TRC
 Forgotten' Voices in the Present
 Voices from Our Past
 Meeting History Face-To-Face: A Guide to Oral History
 Saha In the Classroom
 Entering Tembisa – Book and Cd
 Katorus Stories
 Mages of Defiance South African Resistance Posters of the 1980s
 Red on Black: The Story of The South African Poster Movement
 Transition's Child: The Anti-Privatisation Forum -
 History in The Making: Documents Reflecting a Changing South Africa
 Zapu Through Zenzo Nkobi's Lens
 The Unbreakable Thread – Non-Racialism in South Africa
 Guide to Archival Sources Relating to The South African Truth and Reconciliation Commission.
 Audiovisual Audit Report: The South African Liberation Struggle

FOIP publications 
 Justice, Unfinished Business and Access to Information
 PAIA: Case Studies from Civil Society DVD
 PAIA Resource Kit
 PAIA Workshop Guide
 Paper Wars – Access to Information in South Africa
 Accessing Information for Better Basic Education
 Activating PAIA for Adcocacy
 PAIA Visual Framework Poster
 Accessing Information for Better Basic Education
 Accessing Information for Your Community
 Accessing Information in the LGBTI Sector
 Activating PAIA for Advocacy
 Using PAIA to Promote Housing Rights
 Accessing Information Using PAIA poster:
 PAIA poster – Structures of Government
 PAIA Unpacked: A Resource for Lawyers and Paralegals
 PAIA Visual Framework Poster
 PAIA: Case Studies from Civil Society DVD
 LGBTI and Access to Information in Africa
 The Translating PAIA Guide
 The Request Process Flowchart
 The Transparency and Local Government Guide
 The Proactively Ensuring Access Handout
 The Municipal Managers' Access to Information Sheet
 The Enabling Participation Through Access to Information Handout

References 

Archives in South Africa
History of South Africa